Rasim Mahammad Alguliyev (January 20, 1958) — doctor of technical sciences, full member (academician) of Azerbaijan National Academy of Sciences (ANAS). Vice-president of ANAS, director-general of the Institute of Information Technology of ANAS.

Personal life 
	Rasim Mahammad Alguliyev was born on January 20, 1958, in Barda district, Azerbaijan Republic.
	In 1979, he graduated from the faculty of "Automation and Computer Engineering" of the Azerbaijan Polytechnic Institute named after Ch.Ildirim (present Azerbaijan Technical University) with a degree in "Systems engineering".
	In 1983-1986, he completed his PhD in "Automated control systems" at the Institute of Cybernetics (present Institute of Control Systems of ANAS) of Azerbaijan Academy of Sciences.
   In 1979–1986, he worked as an engineer and senior engineer, Komsomol secretary at the Institute of Cybernetics of Azerbaijan Academy of Sciences.
	In 1986, he was transferred to the Department of Automated Control Systems (ACS) of Azerbaijan Academy of Sciences. 
   In 1986–1991, he worked at positions of senior engineer, leading engineer, chief engineer of the project "Republican network of computing centers and data transmission", technical director – deputy director at the Department of ACS (in 1997, on the basis of ACS Department was established Information-Telecommunication Scientific Center).
	He is the director of the Institute of Information Technology of ANAS since 2002 (the institute was established on the basis of Information-Telecommunication Scientific Center in 2002). He is doctor of technical sciences, professor, full member (academician) of ANAS. 
	In 2013–2019, he was academician-secretary of ANAS.
	In 2019, he was elected vice-president of ANAS.
   In 2009, he was awarded with  "Taraggi" medal by the decree of the President of the Republic of Azerbaijan. 
   In 2019, he was awarded with the medal ""100th anniversary of the Azerbaijan Democratic Republic (1918-2018)".

Scientific activity 
	In 2002-2020, he was director of the Institute of Information Technology of ANAS. 
	Since 2021 he is director-general of the Institute of Information Technology of ANAS.
	In 2007, he was elected a corresponding member of ANAS in "Informatics".
	In 2014, he was elected a full member (academician) of ANAS in "Informatics".
	In 2013-2019, he was an academician-secretary of ANAS. 
	In 2019, he was elected a vice-president of ANAS.
	He is a Chairman of Scientific Council on "Physics, Mathematics and technical sciences" under the Council for Organization and Coordination of Scientific Research of Azerbaijan Republic. 
	He advised 4 Doctor of Sciences (DSc) and supervised 31 PhD students. He is currently advising 8 DSc and supervising 12 PhD theses.
	In 2021, academician Rasim Alguliyev was listed among the top 2% scientists in the world identified by Stanford University.

Scientific expertise activity 
	Editorial Board Member of the journals:
        ¤   Applied and Computational Mathematics   
    ¤	CAAI Transactions on Intelligence Technology   
    ¤	Telecommunications (Телекоммуникации)  
    ¤   Digital Technology Security (Безопасность цифровых технологий)   
    ¤	Informatics and Control Problems   
    ¤	Problems of Information Technology   
    ¤	Problems of Information Society 

  He is a chairman of the dissertation council at the Institute of Information Technology of ANAS.

Social and political activity 
	Member of the editorial board of the National Encyclopedia of Azerbaijan.
	Elected a member of the Coordinating Council of World Azerbaijanis at the 3rd Congress of World Azerbaijanis.
	Member of the "Coordination Commission for Information Security" of the Republic of Azerbaijan.
	Member of the New Azerbaijan Party.

Publications 
Total number of publications: 651 
	Number of articles published in:
            ¤	international refereed journals: 252
      ¤	national refereed journals: 133
	Number of papers published in proceedings of:
            ¤	international conferences: 157
      ¤	national conferences: 60
	Monographs: 4
	Scientific surveys and booklets: 28
	Textbooks: 9
	Dictionaries and encyclopedias: 4
	Inventions and patents: 4

Number of papers indexed in: 
        ¤  Web of Science: 187    ¤  Scopus: 118

Citations:
  - Google Scholar  
  - Scopus

Sources 

1958 births
Living people
Azerbaijani computer scientists
Academic staff of Baku State University
Azerbaijan Technical University alumni
Azerbaijani academicians